"The Heart" is a song written and originally recorded by American country music artist Kris Kristofferson on his 1986 album Repossessed. It was covered by American country music artist Lacy J. Dalton on her 1989 album Survivor and released in January 1989 as the album's first single. Dalton's version of the song peaked at number 13 on the Billboard Hot Country Singles chart.

Chart performance

References

1986 songs
1989 singles
Kris Kristofferson songs
Lacy J. Dalton songs
Songs written by Kris Kristofferson
Song recordings produced by Jimmy Bowen
Song recordings produced by James Stroud